Sparco S.p.A. is an Italian auto part and accessory company headquartered in Volpiano near Turin that specializes in producing items such as seats, steering wheels, harnesses, racewear and helmets. Sparco branded alloy wheels are produced under licence by OZ Group. They also sponsor many types of auto races including rallies and single-seaters.

History

The company was founded in 1977 in Italy and today the ownership is still Italian; the company is one of the leading manufacturers of racing safety equipment.

In 1977, FIA decided to restrict their safety standards, in order to decrease injuries during races: the first product that brought fame to Sparco, was a fireproof racing suit, that could withstand 11 seconds in fire, an absolute record for the time. This resistance was more than enough to meet new FIA 8856-2000 requests. Moreover, that was the only effective alternative to the cotton racing suits, which were not fireproof and did not meet the new requirements. Each year Sparco improved their technology, so the fire resistance of their suits increased yearly.

Sponsorships

Formula One
  Red Bull Racing
  McLaren F1 Team

Formula 2
  DAMS
  Prema Racing (Robert Shwartzman)
  Trident (Marino Sato)

IndyCar
  A. J. Foyt Enterprises
  Arrow McLaren SP
  Carlin
  Chip Ganassi Racing
  Harding Steinbrenner Racing
  Juncos Racing
  Rahal Letterman Lanigan Racing

NASCAR
  Kaulig Racing
  Richard Childress Racing

World Endurance Championship

 Aston Martin Racing

Former sponsorships

Formula One
  Arrows
   Benetton Formula
  Ferrari
  Forti
  Jordan Grand Prix
  MasterCard Lola
  Midland F1 Racing
  Minardi
  Prost Grand Prix
  Super Aguri F1
  Spyker F1
  Team Lotus (2010–11)/Caterham F1 Team
  Toyota Racing
   Virgin Racing
  Williams
SUBARU WRC 1990 2012

See also 

List of Italian companies

Notes and references

External links
 

Auto parts suppliers of Italy
Automotive motorsports and performance companies
Automotive companies established in 1977
Italian companies established in 1977
Italian brands
Metropolitan City of Turin
Companies based in Piedmont